The Honey Lake Fault Zone is a right lateral-moving (dextral) geologic fault extending through northwestern Nevada and northeastern California.  It is considered an integral part of the Walker Lane.

A  zone of disturbed landforms reveals the fault's presence on the surface.  The geological evidence shows at least four surface-faulting earthquakes have occurred in the late Holocene era.

References

Additional reading
 Dextral Displacement on the Honey Lake Fault Zone, Northern Walker Lane 
 USGS Database

Seismic faults of California
Seismic faults of Nevada